PNU-120596 is a drug that acts as a potent and selective positive allosteric modulator for the α7 subtype of neural nicotinic acetylcholine receptors. It is used in scientific research into cholinergic regulation of dopamine and glutamate release in the brain.

References 

Nicotinic agonists
Stimulants
Phenol ethers
Chloroarenes
Ureas
Isoxazoles